The Nebraska Cornhuskers men's basketball team represents the University of Nebraska–Lincoln in the Big Ten Conference of NCAA Division I. The program's first game was an 11–8 win over the Lincoln YMCA in 1897. Three years later, Nebraska played its first game against another university, a 37–5 victory over Nebraska Wesleyan. The program has an all-time record of 1,529–1,410, with seven NCAA tournament appearances and 16 NIT appearances.

Nebraska has the distinction of being the only major conference program to have never won a game in the NCAA Tournament, and did not make the tournament until 1986. Much of the team's modest success came during the 14-year tenure of Danny Nee, Nebraska's all-time winningest head coach. Nee led the Cornhuskers to five of their seven NCAA Tournament appearances and six NIT bids, including the 1996 NIT championship, NU's only national postseason title. After Nee was fired in 2000, Barry Collier was hired and led the program for six years, until leaving to become athletic director at Butler University. Nebraska then hired Doc Sadler from UTEP, who led the Cornhuskers through the school's transition from the Big 12 to the Big Ten, but like Collier, failed to make an NCAA Tournament appearance. Tim Miles took Nebraska to the tournament in his second season, but did not make it back, and was fired in 2019, when Nebraska hired former Chicago Bulls head coach Fred Hoiberg.

Season-by-season results

  There are several discrepancies between the official records of the University of Nebraska and Big Eight Conference. Years in question are 1910–11, 1912–13, 1920–21, 1924–25, 1929–30, 1932–33, 1945–46, and 1960–61. All values listed are from Nebraska's media guide.

References

 
Nebraska
Nebraska Cornhuskers basketball seasons